Isthmus Zapotec, also known as Juchitán Zapotec (native name diidxazá; Spanish: Zapoteco del Istmo), is a Zapotecan language spoken in Tehuantepec and Juchitán de Zaragoza, in the Mexican state of Oaxaca. According to the census of 1990 it has about 85,000 native speakers, however this number is rapidly decreasing, as speakers shift to Spanish.

Guevea de Humboldt Zapotec, a different language, is sometimes referred to as "Northern Isthmus Zapotec."

Since the Ley General de Derechos Lingüísticos de los Pueblos Indígenas was passed in 2003 Isthmus Zapotec, along with all other indigenous languages of Mexico, was officially recognised by the Mexican State.

Phonology

The consonants of Isthmus Zapotec are shown below. There are two types of consonants: strong and weak. Strong and weak consonants are called Fortis and Lenis.  Fortis voiceless consonants that are represented by double letter for example: nn symbolizes the fortis of /n/.  Fortis consonants are also longer than lenis consonants.

Consonants
The consonants for Isthmus Zapotec are as follows:

This sound "bŕ" occurs very rarely for a bilabial trill [ʙ]. It occurs in words like "berenbŕ".

A couple consonant sounds may also be geminated (ex.; /l/ ~ /lː/, /n/ ~ /nː/).

Vowels
Isthmus Zapotec has five vowels (a, e, i, o, u). These occur in the three phonation types of stressed syllables: model, checked, and laryngealized.

Checked vowels sound as if they end in glottal stop; for example words such as in English "what, light take, put." The glottal stop is a vowel feature. Checked vowels can also be a slightly laryngealized during a glottal closure.

Laryngealized vowels are longer and pronounced with a creaky voice. Sometimes they are pronounced with a clear pronunciation of the vowel after a soft glottal stop. There are not breathy vowels in Zapotec.

Morphology 
The verb structure for the Isthmus Zapotec is as follows: ASPECT (THEME) (CAUSATIVE) ROOT VOWEL. The verbs of Isthmus Zapotec usually contain around seven aspects. Research conducted by Stephen A. Marlett and Velma B. Pickett suggests “that for some verbs the completive and potential aspect prefixes are added at an earlier stratum than for most verbs”. In Isthmus Zapotec, the four main causative prefixes are added /k-/, /si-/, /z-/, and /Ø-/ and at times, two of them can be found in a verb. E.g. /si-k-/. The prefix /u-/ allows for the addition of the word “make” into the word “quiet” as in u-si-ganî, meaning “make quiet”. The Isthmus Zapotec refer to themselves by using the first person inclusive pronoun.

In Isthmus Zapotec, the verb stems can be single morphemes or they can also be compounds of two morphemes. There are three compound stems, the first two are highlighted by the above two charts. In the first chart, -eʔeda translates to 'come' and nee translates to 'and or with' with morphemes added in the beginning and at the end of the word, altering its overall meaning. They are simple (monomorphemic) verb stem plus particle. In the second chart, -naabatranslates to 'ask' while diʔidžaʔ translates to 'word' which are simple verb stem plus noun stem. The third compound is a simple verb stem plus noun stem where -aaka and -unni are the verb stem. The verb stem -aaka translates to 'happen or come to pass' while -unni translates to 'do'. Any Spanish infinitive is theoretically a second component in the compound. Spanish words are also incorporated with Isthmus Zapotec morphemes such as r-aaka-retratar-beé meaning 'he gets his picture taken' where the Spanish word retratar has Isthmus Zapotec morphemes at the beginning and at the end. The charts below are the classes of morphemes in Isthmus Zapotec:

Classes of Morphemes in Isthmus Zapotec 

An example for the morpheme {-ka}, attaching it to an Isthmus Zapotec word will make the word plural. The Isthmus Zapotec word zigi (chin) when {-ka} is added as a prefix will become kazigi (chins). Zike (shoulder) will become kazike (shoulders) and diaga (ear) will become kadiaga (ears).

Yes/no question particles In Isthmus Zapotec are not mandatory, however, the question particle [lá?] is required in these form of questions.

Syllable structure
Isthmus Zapotec has mainly open syllables.

Syntax 
Isthmus Zapotec has a hierarchical level that is composed of six structural levels: discourse level, utterance level, sentence level, clause level, phrase level, and word level. Each levels contains different components that differentiates one another and their complexity.

Discourse Level → Utterance Level → Sentence Level → Clause Level → Phrase Level → Word Level

- It is displaying in order of highest complexity to lowest complexity.

Discourse Level 

 Discourse level is the highest level of complexity in Isthmus Zapotec that covers a broad range levels from utterance to verbal to conversation unit. 
There are still limitations of discourse level as to whether there should be another level between discourse level and utterance level. 
The discourse level comes in two forms, monologue and conversation. 
Monologue form includes similar properties of utterance level to the point they are overlapping one another. 
Conversation form has two subclasses, dependent and independent clauses. Independent clause is more common than dependent clause, it has utterances or non-verbal units as its opening and closing in most cases.

Utterance Level 

 Utterance level consists of two class, dependent and independent. Dependent utterance has three subdivisions, conversation utterance opener is used in initial human interaction. conversation utterance sequence is used in ongoing speech (listen and respond), and conversation utterance closer is used in closing the conversation. Independent utterance types include poetry, letters,  instructions, etc.

 Utterance opener: Hello, how are you doing today?
 Utterance sequence: I'm doing great, thanks for asking.
 Utterance closer: Bye, see you later.

Sentence Level 

 Sentence level is composed of grammatical units that can be a complete statement, dependent and independent classes are its major category. Dependent sentence is the subsequent  statement of a previous sentence while independent sentence is not. Dependent has two clauses and each with different composition.

 Clause sentence: multiple clauses and in occasional cases of tagmeme, a smallest functional element unit in language. 
 Non-clause sentence: incomplete clauses or fragments.

 Independent level includes two different classes as well, clause and non-clause sentence.

 Clause sentence: contains only clauses
 Non-clause sentence: A phrase or word that forms independent clause but less prevalent, only vocatives and limited informational sentences.

Clause Level 

 A clause is similar to a sentence, it can include another clause within the clause and phrases. The clause is part of predicate in which belongs to a sentence containing an action about the subject. Clause level contains two categories, dependent and independent.

 Dependent clauses takes slots in sentences, clauses, or phrases. For example, the sentence "when she gets here, tell me," has two dependent markers, one is when (time slot) and the other is the comma. There could also be location slot just like in the sentence she's driving to the dentist. 
 Independent clauses takes only takes places in obligatory slots that can be clause or phrase at the same time.

Phrase Level 

 Phrase level mainly contains few words that function as units and dependent phrases even when phrase level is primarily independent. For example, "how much money does he have?", how much money is the independent clause, and the reply (a number) is the dependent phrase including the tagmeme. 
 Phrases are mostly composed of words or filled with other clauses and phrases.

Word Level 

 Word level is the most common level among the hierarchical structure, mainly composed of phonemes, affixes, suffixes, and other grammatical units. Two categories of word level is its ability to become a sentence by its own, dependent and independent.

Independent words can be separated and count as a complete sentence by its own and at least reply to a question that is specific to an object, location, etc. For example, "what do you call this building?" or "which store did you go to?".

Dependent words have two forms, enclitic and proclitic. Separating them will not form a complete sentence or response but they fill in more slots than independent words.

Poems

Further reading

References

Pickett, Velma B. 1959. The grammatical hierarchy of Isthmus Zapotec. Ph.D. dissertation, University of Michigan.
Marlett, Stephen A. & Velma B. Pickett. 1996. El pronombre inaudible en el zapoteco del Istmo. In Zarina Estrada Fernández, Max Figueroa Esteva & Gerardo López Cruz (eds.) III Encuentro de Lingüística en el Noroeste, 119–150. Hermosillo, Sonora: Editorial Unison.
Marlett, Stephen A. 1987. The syllable structure and aspect morphology of Isthmus Zapotec. International Journal of American Linguistics 53: 398–422.
Sicoli, Mark A. 1999. A comparison of Spanish loanwords in two Zapotec languages: Contact-induced language change in Lachixío and Juchitán Zapotec. University of Pittsburgh, M.A. Thesis.
De Korne, Haley. 2016. "A treasure" and "a legacy": Individual and communal (re)valuing of Isthmus Zapotec in multilingual Mexico. Working Papers in Educational Linguistics 31.1:21-42. Online access

External links

SIL Mexico — Isthmus Zapotec
Language resources in Isthmus Zapotec
OLAC resources in and about the Isthmus Zapotec language
ELAR archive of Documentation of Isthmus Zapotec
Isthmus Zapotec Collection of Randi Moore at the Archive of the Indigenous Languages of Latin America
Isthmus Zapotec Pronunciation and Spelling Guide
The New World Translation of the Christian Greek Scriptures in Zapotec (Isthmus), online bible 
Nice article about Isthmus Zapotec Phonetics :-)

Zapotec languages